The blackish tapaculo (Scytalopus latrans) is a species of bird in the family Rhinocryptidae. It is found in Colombia, Ecuador, Peru, and Venezuela.

Taxonomy and systematics

The blackish tapaculo was originally described by Hellmayr as a species. Later it was reclassified as a subspecies of unicolored tapaculo (Scytalopus unicolor) and later still returned to full species status. There are two subspecies, the "blackish" S. l. latrans and the "Pacific" S. l. subcinereus. The latter is sometimes considered to be a separate species. The former "Peruvian" subspecies S. l. intermedius has been elevated to species status as Utcubamba tapaculo by the International Ornithological Congress (IOC).

Description

Males weigh  and females . The male of the "blackish" subspecies is dark to very dark gray and the female is dark gray, sometimes with an olive wash. The juvenile is not well known but is believed to be dull brown. The "Pacific" subspecies male is black while the female is gray, darker above and lighter below, with brown flanks. The juvenile is brown.

Distribution and habitat

The "blackish" subspecies of blackish tapaculo inhabits both slopes and interior ranges of the Andes from western Venezuela through Colombia and Ecuador to northern Peru. The "Pacific" subspecies inhabits the western slope of the Andes of southwest Ecuador and northwest Peru. The species is believed to be sedentary.

Typical vegetative associations include Chusquea bamboo and Polylepis scrub. It also inhabits other shrubs, swampy areas, and second growth.

Behavior

Feeding

The blackish tapaculo feeds on and near the ground, gleaning soil, moss, foliage, and stems for small arthropods.

Breeding

Very little is known about the blackish tapaculo's breeding phenology. The one known nest was globular and in an earthen bank covered with clubmoss and ferns.

Status

The IUCN has rated the blackish tapaculo as of Least Concern.

References

blackish tapaculo
Birds of the Colombian Andes
Birds of the Ecuadorian Andes
Birds of the Peruvian Andes
Birds of the Venezuelan Andes
blackish tapaculo
Taxonomy articles created by Polbot